Drubskin, also known as "Drub" (born August 14, 1973; in Derby, Connecticut) is a fetish artist known for his homoerotic illustrations and erotic comic book work. He is based in San Diego, California, and has ties to Skinheads Against Racial Prejudice and the punk subculture.

Drawing since the age of 15, Drub's illustrations incorporate various fetishistic interests in footwear, sportswear, subculture-specific clothing, rubber, sado-masochism, and watersports. Most of the men he depicts are part of the punk, skinhead, and working class communities, drawn in a homo-masculine manner. His work is typically done in a comic book style, with bright colors and heavy line weight.

In 1991 he moved from Connecticut to Kansas City, Missouri to attend the Kansas City Art Institute where he eventually earned his Bachelor of Fine Arts in Illustration. In 1995 he was asked to write a first-hand account of his sexual exploits in the punk and skinhead scene for a webzine called Nightcharm, as a way to promote his art. His pseudonym Drub is derived from his writing style, as a play on the verb which means to beat or thrash.

His website and column garnered him attention from the gay male community at large and by 2000 his work began appearing in gay magazines worldwide. Drub began exhibiting his work in the 2000s and in 2003 he had his first international solo art exhibition at Mr. B's in Amsterdam. Drub has also shown his work in galleries in Los Angeles, Toronto, Berlin, Amsterdam, and participates annually in the Seattle Erotic Art Festival. He has had work published in several publications, including Freshmen, Instigator and Blue magazine. He sells hand-illustrated greeting cards for Mr. B in Amsterdam and Berlin, and The Leatherman in New York City.

Features and published works

 Freshmen Magazine, 2002, illustration for story "Chemistry"
 Solanas Online – Issue 2, 2003, Drub Coloring Book
 Instigator Magazine – 2/15/04 – Featured Artist
 Blue Magazine, Issue 52 – 9/01/04 – Featured Artist
 Turnover, Malware, ed. AIDS Project Los Angeles: The Institute for Gay Men's Health, 2005, 
 BuzzcockNYC Monthly Party, 8/31/06 – New York City, poster art
 Best Gay Erotica 2007, "The Welcome Back Fuck", ed. Richard Labonte, written by Dale Lazarov, 2007, 
 Hard To Swallow Comics #3, "Dem Bones", All Thumbs Press/Marginalized Publications, 2007, 
 Best Erotic Comics 2009, "Dem Bones", ed. Greta Christina, Last Gasp, 2009,

Gallery shows

 Drubbish Show, Fluke Gallery, Kansas City, Missouri - May 31, 2002
 Drub(x)3 Art Exhibition – Mr. B, Amsterdam/Berlin - 4/12/03
 Seattle Erotic Art Festival – Consolidated Works, Seattle, WA - 1/30/04 to 2/1/04
 5×5=25 – Galeria ARTopia, Albuquerque, NM - 7/31/04
 Seattle Erotic Art Festival (Invited Artist) – Consolidated Works, Seattle, WA - 4/16/05
 Seattle Erotic Art Festival (Featured Artist/Advertising) – Consolidated Works, Seattle, WA - 5/01/06
 Toonfetish – Antebellum Gallery, Los Angeles, CA - 6/30/07
 Seattle Erotic Art Festival (Invited Artist) - Seattle Center Exhibition Hall, Seattle, WA - 3/1/08

References 

1973 births
American artists
American erotic artists
Fetish artists
American gay artists
LGBT comics creators
Living people
Pseudonymous artists
LGBT people from Connecticut
21st-century American LGBT people